I Was a Cub Scout were a two-piece synthpop/indie rock band from Nottingham, England, consisting of Todd Marriott (vocals, synthesizers, guitar, formerly of Through Winter) and William Bowerman (drums, formerly of Sixteen Hours). The band started in 2005, and split in July 2008.

History
Marriott started the project in June 2005, becoming a band with the addition of Bowerman in 2006. After releasing their first single they were signed to XL Recordings label Abeano. "Pink Squares" was released in November 2006, and followed in 2007 with "I Hate Nightclubs" and "Our Smallest Adventures".

A compilation of tracks from the band's early singles, Iwasacubscout, was released in 2007. The band's first album proper, I Want You To Know That There Is Always Hope, was released in February 2008, preceded by a new version of "Pink Squares", released as a double A-side with "Echoes", which peaked at no. 71 on the UK Singles Chart. The album was well received by critics, with Stewart Mason of Allmusic calling it "ultra-catchy synth pop", and the NME commenting on "positive songwriting which makes life that little more liveable". PopMatters' Andrew Martin called it "a damn fine effort worthy of a listen". The tour to promote the album was interrupted after Marriott was hit in the face with a glass at their concert in Southampton.
 
The duo added James Spence of Rolo Tomassi and Sam Hudson of Youth Movies as touring members. Follow up single "The Hunter's Daughter" was withdrawn prior to release after the band announced their split in June 2008, citing "countless problems over the past year or so", although they continued to complete their UK tour into the following month.

Post-split activities
Since the split, both former members have created new bands. Todd Marriott has formed YGT, an electronic duo with Tom Mclean.

Immediately after IWACS split, Bowerman formed the instrumental band Brontide. Bowerman also plays live and also session drums for La Roux and is tour drummer for Summer Camp and Paul Mullen (of yourcodenameis:milo) also announced on his Twitter that he had been recording with Will and Gordon Moakes of Bloc Party.

Discography

Studio albums
 I Want You to Know That There Is Always Hope (2008), Abeano

Compilations
Iwasacubscout (2007), Abeano

Singles

References

External links
 Bandcamp
 MySpace page
 DrownedinSound band page

Musical groups established in 2005
Musical groups disestablished in 2008
Rock music duos
English synth-pop groups